Sayt'uqucha or Sayt'u Qucha (Quechua suyt'u, sayt'u rectangular, qucha lake, lagoon, "rectangular lake", hispanicized spellings Saytococha) is a lake in Peru located in the Puno Region, San Román Province, Cabanillas District. It lies southeast of Saraqucha, the largest lake of the district.

References

Lakes of Peru
Lakes of Puno Region